Milton Morris "Mickey" Whitehurst (August 20, 1873 – December 1953) was an American sportsman. As a  wrestler, he competed in the men's freestyle bantamweight at the 1904 Summer Olympics. Whitehurst played ice hockey for the University of Maryland, and was part of the team that won the Northampton Hockey Champions in 1898. Whitehurst also coached the football team at the North Carolina College of Agriculture and Mechanic Arts in 1907 and 1908.

Head coaching record

References

External links
 

1873 births
1953 deaths
Baltimore Bees football coaches
McDaniel Green Terror football coaches
NC State Wolfpack football coaches
Players of American football from Baltimore
Physicians from Maryland
American male sport wrestlers
American men's ice hockey players
Olympic wrestlers of the United States
Wrestlers at the 1904 Summer Olympics